Georgia Bishop-Cash (born 7 March 2001) is a swimmer and 4.0 point Australian wheelchair basketball player.  She made her international debut with the Australian U25 team (the Devils) at the 2015 Women's U25 Wheelchair Basketball World Championship in Beijing, winning silver.  She was part of the Minecraft Comets team that won the Women's National Wheelchair Basketball League (WNWBL) championship title in 2014 and 2018, and were named the Queensland Sporting Wheelies Team of the Year for 2014. In May 2019, she was part of the Devils team that won silver at the 2019 Women's U25 Wheelchair Basketball World Championship in Suphanburi, Thailand.

Biography
Georgia Bishop-Cash was born with arthrogryposis and bilateral club feet, requiring her to walk with the aid of calipers. She had painful surgery almost every year until she was eight. Regular exercise was recommended, so she began cycling on an exercise bike and swimming. She enjoyed swimming and started doing it competitively. In 2012, she won the 50m, 100m and 200m freestyle and 50m backstroke events in her age group at the Queensland Schools Championship, where she was the youngest competitor.

In June 2009 Bishop-Cash took up wheelchair basketball, and soon became a member if the state junior team, the Rolling Thunder. In 2014, she won her first national gold medal with the Rolling Thunder at the 2014 Kevin Coombs Cup. She joined the Queensland senior women's side, the Minecraft Comets, and was mentored by coach Tom Kyle and senior player Bridie Kean. The Minecraft Comets won the Women's National Wheelchair Basketball League championship in 2014, and were named the Queensland Sporting Wheelies Team of the Year. She was part of the Comets side that won the championship again in 2018.

In June 2015 her Paralympic dream came another step closer when she was selected as the youngest member of the U25 Women's side, known as the Devils, which won silver at the 2015 Women's U25 Wheelchair Basketball World Championship in Beijing. Four years later she won a second silver medal with the Devils at the 2019 Women's U25 Wheelchair Basketball World Championship in Suphanburi, Thailand.

Bishop-Cash attended Mary Immaculate School in Annerley, Queensland.

References

2001 births
Australian women's wheelchair basketball players
Living people
Sportswomen from Queensland